Turiec River may refer to:
Turiec River (Váh)
Turiec River (Sajó)